The 1760s BC was a decade lasting from January 1, 1769 BC to December 31, 1760 BC.

Events and trends
 1766 BC: The Shang dynasty in China conquers the Xia dynasty.

Significant people
 Hammurabi, king of Babylon from around 1792 to 1750 BC
 Rim-Sin I, king of Larsa from 1822 to 1763 BC, according to the middle chronology
 Yarim-Lim I, king of the Amorite kingdom of Yamhad in present-day Syria, from around 1780 to 1764 BC
 Zimri-Lim, king of the Middle Eastern city-state of Mari from around 1775 to 1761 BC
 Shibtu, queen of Zimri-Lim throughout his reign

References

18th century BC